Bohra is an extinct genus of macropod from the Plio-Pleistocene of Australia.

Taxonomy
 
The type species, Bohra paulae was first described in 1982 from material found in Wellington Caves in New South Wales. Bohra is the name of a legendary kangaroo of the Euahlayi tribe from New South Wales. Bohra was said to walk on all four limbs and possessed sharp canine teeth before being removed by men. Living tree-kangaroos share similar proportions between the front and hind limbs.

Three other species have been described: Bohra wilkinsonorum from southeastern Queensland in 2004, Bohra illuminata from south-central Australia in 2008, and Bohra nullarbora from Western Australia in 2009.

Bohra is considered a plesiomorphic sister taxon to the living tree-kangaroos (Dendrolagus).

Description

It shows many similarities with tree-kangaroos in their cranio-dental and hind limb morphology, and in spite of its size, shows many of the same arboreal adaptations as its living relatives. Among the similarities are the calcaneus being flat and broad with the cuboid articulation not being stepped and the height-to-width ratio of the articulation being much smaller than in that of other types of kangaroos.

Remains of Bohra illuminata also show morphological similarities to rock wallabies (Petrogale); recent molecular studies suggest that rock wallabies are the closest living relatives of tree-kangaroos, further proving Bohra is of close relation to these groups.

Distribution and habitat
Bohra wilkinsonorum is the oldest species (Pliocene), while the remaining species are of Pleistocene age. All species of Bohra inhabited regions more southerly than any tree-kangaroo, including the now treeless Nullarbor plain. Given the arboreal nature of Bohra, it seems many regions of Australia were able to better support tree cover in the recent past. Bohra went extinct in the Late Pleistocene; its extinction may have coincided with Australia's increased aridification during this time.

References

Prehistoric macropods
Pliocene mammals of Australia
Pleistocene mammals of Australia
Pleistocene extinctions
Prehistoric marsupial genera